Geomerinus is a monotypic genus of centipedes in the family Geophilidae. It was described by French myriapodologist Henry Wilfred Brolemann in 1912. Its sole species is Geomerinus curtipes, originally described as Geophilus curtipes by Erich Haase in 1887. It is endemic to Australia.

Description
The original description of this species is based on a single female with 71 pairs of legs. This species ranges from 5 cm to 7 cm in length.

Distribution
The species occurs in north-eastern coastal Queensland and south-eastern coastal New South Wales.

Behaviour
The centipedes are solitary terrestrial predators that inhabit plant litter, soil and rotting wood.

References

 

 
Geophilidae
Centipede genera
Centipedes of Australia
Endemic fauna of Australia
Fauna of New South Wales
Fauna of Queensland
Animals described in 1912
Taxa named by Henry Wilfred Brolemann
Monotypic arthropod genera